The 244th Expeditionary Combat Aviation Brigade is a Combat Aviation Brigade in the United States Army Reserve.  It is one of two aviation brigades in the Army Reserve Aviation Command. 

The brigade moved from Fort Sheridan, IL to Aurora, IL in 1994.

The brigade consists of a Headquarters and Headquarters company, two general support aviation battalions, one fixed wing battalion, and an aviation maintenance battalion, as follows:
  Headquarters and Headquarters Company (HHC), 244th Aviation Brigade, headquartered at Fort knox, kentucky
  7th Battalion, 158th Aviation Regiment, headquartered at Fort Hood, Texas
  5th Battalion, 159th Aviation Regiment, headquartered at Fort Eustis, Virginia
  2nd Battalion, 228th Aviation Regiment, headquartered at McGuire AFB, New Jersey
  90th Aviation Support Battalion (90th ASB), headquartered at Army Reserve Center at Fort Worth, Texas

The brigade consists of approximately 2,700 soldiers and 130 aircraft in 13 states.

References

Citations

Bibliography

244
Military units and formations established in 1988
1988 establishments in New Jersey